New London High School is a public 9-12 High School Located in New London, Wisconsin. Its enrollment was estimated at 706 students for the 2020-2021 school year. NLHS moved to its current location in 1999.

Facilities
A new sports stadium opened in 2009.

Athletics 
New London's mascot is Percy the Bulldog, and the school competes in the Bay Conference with eight other schools. New London competed in the East Central Conference from 1970 to 1979. New London competed in the Mid Eastern Conference from 1962 to 1969.

State championships 
 Boys' basketball 1999 Division 2
 Girls' swimming - 2007 Division 2 200 Medley State Champions
 Girls' track and field wheelchair 2010
 Girls' basketball - 2011 Division 2
 Girls' basketball - 2012 Division 2
 Girls' softball - 2013 Division 2

Performing arts
NLHS has a competitive show choir named "Vision". Until 2017, the school hosted its own competition, the Center Stage Invitational. In 2022, the school once more began to host an annual show choir competition, renamed as the New London Singstock Fesitval.

Alumni
 Cole Konrad, first Bellator MMA heavyweight champion in 2010
 Jack Voight, Wisconsin State Treasurer, Class of 1963
 Esther Heideman, American opera singer, Class of 1988

References

External links
District website

Public high schools in Wisconsin
Schools in Waupaca County, Wisconsin
Educational institutions established in 1999
1999 establishments in Wisconsin